Provatas (Greek: Προβατάς) is a larger village in Kapetan Mitrousi, Serres regional unit, northern Greece. It has 1,099 inhabitants (2011 census).

Until 1923, the village was called Yenikoi or Yeniköy and inhabited mostly by Turks and Bulgarians. 
It was hard fought over on October 3 and 4, 1916, between the 10th (Irish) Division and the Bulgarian Army. The Irish took and held the village, despite fierce and costly counterattacks by the Bulgarians.

References 

Populated places in Serres (regional unit)